These are the Official Charts Company's UK Dance Albums Chart number ones of 2015. The dates listed in the menus below through 4 July 2015 represent the Saturday after the Sunday the chart was announced, as per the way the dates are given in chart publications such as the ones produced by Billboard, Guinness, and Virgin. As of 9 July 2015, the chart week runs from Friday to Thursday with the chart-date given as the following Thursday.

Chart history

See also
List of UK Albums Chart number ones of the 2010s
List of UK Dance Singles Chart number ones of 2015
List of UK Album Downloads Chart number ones of the 2010s
List of UK Independent Singles Chart number ones of 2015
List of UK R&B Albums Chart number ones of 2015
List of UK Independent Singles Chart number ones of 2015
List of UK Compilation Chart number ones of the 2010s

References

External links
Dance Albums Chart at the Official Charts Company
UK Top 40 Dance Albums Chart at BBC Radio 1

2015 in British music
United Kingdom Dance Albums
2015